"Somebody to Love" is a song co-written and recorded by American country music artist Suzy Bogguss.  It was released in April 1998 as the first single from the album Nobody Love, Nobody Gets Hurt.  The song spent 19 weeks on the Billboard Hot Country Singles & Tracks chart, peaking at number 33 during the week of July 4, 1998.  It was written by Bogguss, Matraca Berg and Doug Crider.

Chart performance

References

1998 singles
1998 songs
Suzy Bogguss songs
Songs written by Matraca Berg
Capitol Records Nashville singles